The  is an electric multiple unit (EMU) train type operated on the Tokyo Metro Hanzōmon Line in Tokyo, Japan since 2003. Introduced into service on 1 July 2003, a total of six ten-car trainsets were manufactured by Nippon Sharyo between 2002 and 2003 to augment the 8000 series trains following the extension to Oshiage.

Description 
The train type is used on inter-running services via the Hanzomon Line to the Tokyu Den-en-toshi Line and the Tobu Isesaki and Nikko Lines.

Formations
, the fleet consists of six ten-car sets, numbered 51 to 56, formed as shown below, with five motored (M) cars and five trailer (T) cars. Car 1 is at the Oshiage end.

 Cars 2 and 8 each have two single-arm pantographs, and car 5 is fitted with one.
 Wheelchair spaces are provided in cars 3 and 9.
 Car 2 is designated as a moderately air-conditioned car.

Interior
Passenger accommodation consists of longitudinal bucket-style seating throughout.

Gallery

References

External links

 Tokyo Metro Hanzōmon Line 08 series information 
 Manufacturer's technical info

Electric multiple units of Japan
08 series
Train-related introductions in 2003
1500 V DC multiple units of Japan
Nippon Sharyo multiple units